Mae Na is a tambon (subdistrict) of Chiang Dao District, in Chiang Mai Province, Thailand. In 2020 it had a total population of 9,882 people.

Administration

Central administration
The tambon is subdivided into 13 administrative villages (muban).

Local administration
The whole area of the subdistrict is covered by the subdistrict municipality (Thesaban Tambon) Mae Na (เทศบาลตำบลแม่นะ).

References

External links
Thaitambon.com on Mae Na

Tambon of Chiang Mai province
Populated places in Chiang Mai province